The miller who was a wizard, a cheat and a matchmaker (Russian: Мельник – колдун, обманщик и сват [Melnik – koldun, obmanshchik i svat]) – is a Russian ballad opera in three acts with a libretto by Alexander Ablesimov that premiered on . Its folksong-based music was long attributed to Yevstigney Fomin but is now considered to have been by Mikhail Sokolovsky, and others have contributed music to revivals.

Background
The music for the opera is nowadays agreed to be by Mikhail Sokolovsky, although for a century it was mistakenly attributed to Yevstigney Fomin. The opera was one of the most popular in eighteenth century Russia. Sokolovsky's wife premiered the role of Aniuta, and his sister was in the chorus. Sokolovsky was a violinist at the theatre and much of the music was taken from Russian folksongs. The librettist Ablesimov himself chose many of the folk melodies used. The greater reputation of Fomin was probably responsible for the misattribution of the opera to him. It is also believed that the overture to the opera may have been written by the Bohemian composer, working in Russia, Arnošt Vančura (d. 1802).

The opera is one of the few of its kind which survived in performance in Russia into the nineteenth century. A 1915 revival in Moscow included folksongs arranged by Nikolai Rimsky-Korsakov, and there was a further revival in Paris in 1929, edited by Nikolai Tcherepnin.

Roles

Synopsis
The opera is set in a Russian village.

Act 1: The miller Fadei prospers by exploiting his reputation amongst the peasants as a wizard. Filimon, who has consulted him to find his lost horse, decides to ask his help in winning Anyuta, whose parents cannot decide to whom to marry her; the mother seeks a nobleman, the father a farmer.

Act 2: Filimon explains to Anyuta that he has enlisted Fadei's support. Fetinia, rating Fadei's skills as a fortune-teller, asks who Anyuta's husband will be. The miller sends her on a stroll and says that it will be a gentleman, the first person she will meet on her path. (Filimon, of course). Meeting Ankudin, Fadei assures him that his daughter's husband will be a working farmer. When Fetinia and Ankudin meet they quarrel over the apparently incompatible promises given to them by the miller.

Act 3: At Ankudin's house, amidst Anyuta's friends, Fadei explains that as Filimon is both a landowner and an active farmer, he meets the requirements of both Ankudin and Fetinia. All are satisfied and everything ends happily.

Notes and references
Notes

References

Sources
 Classiclive.org website (Russian only): The Miller (Summary of the plot), Retrieved 7 January 2012
 Findeizen, Nikolai, translated by S. W. Pring, ed. M. Velimirovic and C. R. Jensen, (2008). History of Music in Russia from Antiquity to 1800: Volume II – The Eighteenth Century, Indiana University Press. 
 Gozenpud, A., "Опера Михаила Соколовского «Мельник – колдун, обманщик и сват»" [Opera by Mikhail Sokolovsky "The miller – a wizard, a cheat and a matchmaker], Klassicheskaya Muzika website (Russian only), Retrieved 7 January 2012
 Taruskin, Richard. "Fomin, Yevstigney Ipat'yevich" in Grove Music Online
 Taruskin, Richard. "Sokolovsky, Mikhail Matveyevich" in Grove Music Online

External links

Operas
1779 operas
Russian-language operas
Operas set in Russia